Otyrba is an Abkhazian surname. Notable people with the surname include:

Gueorgui Otyrba, Abkhazian politician and academic 
Rafik Otyrba, Minister for Agriculture of Abkhazia

Abkhaz-language surnames